Obscured by Clouds is the seventh studio album by the English progressive rock band Pink Floyd, released on 2 June 1972 by Harvest and Capitol Records. It serves as the soundtrack for the French film La Vallée, by Barbet Schroeder. It was recorded in two sessions in France, while Pink Floyd were in the midst of touring, and produced by the band.

Obscured by Clouds is shorter than some of Pink Floyd's previous albums, and makes heavy use of the acoustic guitar. Lyrically, the songs centre around love, a common theme in the film the album was inspired by. The album's only single was "Free Four". Obscured by Clouds has been seen as a stopgap for the band, who had started work on their next album, The Dark Side of the Moon (1973). The album reached number six in the United Kingdom and number 46 in the United States;  retrospective opinions from both fans and critics have been mixed, some critics noting the similarities to their later material.

Background
By 1972, Pink Floyd had recorded the soundtracks to the films The Committee (1968) and More (1969), and part of Zabriskie Point (1970). On the back of Mores success, its director Barbet Schroeder asked them to record the soundtrack of his next major project. The new film, La Vallée, featured two travellers on a spiritual quest in New Guinea, and Schroeder thought Pink Floyd would be suitable to provide the music. The group had already started working on another album, The Dark Side of the Moon, including some basic recording and live performances, but took two breaks to Strawberry Studios, Château d'Hérouville, France, either side of a Japanese tour, to write and record music for the film. The album was mixed from 4–6 April at Morgan Sound Studios in London.

As they had done on More, the band saw a rough cut of the film and noted certain timings for cues with a stopwatch. From this, they created a number of pieces that they felt could be cross-faded at various points in the final cut of the film. They were not worried about creating complete songs, feeling that any musical piece would be workable without the need for any solos, but nevertheless, under pressure to produce enough material, they managed to create a series of well-structured songs. Drummer Nick Mason recalls that the sessions were very hurried, and the band spent most of the time in Paris locked away in the studio.

During the first recording session in February 1972, the French television station ORTF filmed a short segment of the band recording the album, including interviews with bassist Roger Waters and guitarist David Gilmour. In a snippet of interview footage at Abbey Road Studios that appeared in the 1974 theatrical version (later released on VHS and Laserdisc and subsequent "Director's Cut" DVD) of Pink Floyd: Live at Pompeii, Waters said that early UK pressings of the album contained excessive sibilance.

After recording had finished, the band fell out with the film company, prompting them to release the soundtrack album as Obscured by Clouds, rather than La Vallée. In response, the film was retitled La Vallée (Obscured by Clouds) on its release.

Songs
The songs on Obscured by Clouds are all short and economical, in contrast to the lengthy instrumentals found on other Floyd albums. A strong country music influence was present on several tracks, with prominent use of acoustic guitar. The album also featured the VCS 3 synthesiser, which Wright had purchased from the BBC Radiophonic Workshop.

The title track makes prominent use of the VCS 3, and features Mason playing electronic drums. The following track, "When You're In" is similar in style; its title came from a phrase said by roadie Chris Adamson. The two pieces were played back-to-back live in late 1972 and on the 1973 tours. They were also part of the set used for the group's collaboration with Roland Petit and the Ballet National de Marseille at the Palais de Sports, Paris, in early 1973.

"Burning Bridges" was one of two songwriting collaborations on the album between keyboardist Richard Wright (who wrote the music) and Waters (who wrote the lyrics). "Wot's... Uh the Deal?" was a straightforward acoustic piece. It was never performed live by Pink Floyd, but Gilmour resurrected the piece for his solo tour in 2006. One of these performances features on Gilmour's 2007 DVD Remember That Night and also the vinyl version of his 2008 live album, Live in Gdańsk.

"Childhood's End" was the last song Pink Floyd released to have lyrics written by Gilmour until the release of A Momentary Lapse of Reason in 1987. The title may have been derived from the Arthur C. Clarke novel of the same name. It was performed live at a few gigs in late 1972 and early the following year; the drum pattern opening the track was recycled for "Time" on The Dark Side of the Moon.

"Free Four" was the first Pink Floyd song since "See Emily Play" to attract significant airplay in the US, and the second (after "Corporal Clegg" from A Saucerful of Secrets) to refer to the death of Waters' father during World War II. The title is derived from the count-in "One, two, 'free, four!", spoken in a Cockney accent. The track was released as a single in the US, as the band felt it was suitable for AM radio.

"Stay" was written and sung by Wright, with lyrics by Waters. It is superficially a love song, except the protagonist cannot remember the girl's name, suggesting that she might have been a groupie. "Absolutely Curtains", the closing instrumental on the album, ends with a recording of the Mapuga tribe chanting, as seen in the film.

Cover
The album's cover was, like several other Pink Floyd albums, designed by Storm Thorgerson and Aubrey Powell of Hipgnosis. The cover is a still from a workprint of La Vallée depicting a man (Jean-Pierre Kalfon as Gaëtan) sitting in a tree, reaching out to pick the fruit from one of its branches. The still is out of focus to the point of complete distortion. Hipgnosis viewed a number of stills from the film on a 35mm projector and liked the visual effect when the slide jammed. Schroeder later said the band did not want to make the cover particularly good as The Dark Side of the Moon would have to compete with it, but Thorgerson insisted it was given proper consideration like any other Floyd album.

Release and reception

Obscured by Clouds was released in the UK on 2 June 1972 and then in the United States on 15 June 1972, both on Harvest. The album reached number one in France, number six on the UK Albums Chart, and number 46 on the US albums chart (where it was certified Gold by the RIAA in 1997). In 1986, the album was released on CD. A digitally remastered CD was released in March 1996 in the UK and August 1996 in the US. It was remixed in 2016 for the Early Years box set, and released individually the following year.

Even among fans, this is not one of Pink Floyd's more popular albums, though Mason has said it is one of his favourite Floyd albums. Retrospective critical reception has been mixed; The Daily Telegraph said "its elegant instrumentals point the way to Dark Side", while Rolling Stone said it was a "dull film soundtrack".

Track listing

Personnel
(all personnel uncredited on the original sleeve)

Pink Floyd
David Gilmour – acoustic, electric and pedal steel guitars, VCS 3 synthesizer, vocals
Nick Mason – drums, percussion
Roger Waters – bass guitar, vocals
Richard Wright – Hammond organ , piano , Farfisa organ , VCS 3 synthesizer, electric piano, vocals

Additional personnel
Hipgnosis – album cover
Mapuga tribe – chant on "Absolutely Curtains"

Charts

Certifications and sales

Cultural references
 The album The Dark Side of the Moog VII (1998) by Klaus Schulze and Pete Namlook is subtitled "Obscured by Klaus".

References
Citations

Sources

External links

Albums produced by David Gilmour
Albums produced by Nick Mason
Albums produced by Richard Wright (musician)
Albums produced by Roger Waters
Albums with cover art by Hipgnosis
Albums with cover art by Storm Thorgerson
Drama film soundtracks
Pink Floyd albums
Pink Floyd soundtracks
Progressive rock soundtracks
1972 soundtrack albums
Capitol Records soundtracks
EMI Records soundtracks
Harvest Records soundtracks
1972 albums
Capitol Records albums
EMI Records albums
Harvest Records albums
Albums recorded in a home studio
Albums recorded at Morgan Sound Studios